Ion is an unincorporated community in Allamakee County, Iowa, United States.

History
 Ion was platted in 1855. Ion was named after a character in a novel a settler had recently read. Ion's population was 52 in 1902.

References

Unincorporated communities in Allamakee County, Iowa
1855 establishments in Iowa
Populated places established in 1855
Unincorporated communities in Iowa